The Good Days Lost (Spanish: Los buenos días perdidos) is a 1975 Spanish comedy film directed by Rafael Gil starring Juan Luis Galiardo, Teresa Rabal, and Queta Claver.

Cast
Juan Luis Galiardo as Lorenzo
Teresa Rabal as Consuelito
Queta Claver as Hortensia
 as Cleofás
 as Don Remigui
Mabel Escaño as apothecarian
Eulália del Pino as Genoveva
Manuel Ayuso as Comerciante

References

External links

1975 comedy films
Spanish comedy films
Films directed by Rafael Gil
1970s Spanish-language films
1970s Spanish films